Steven Michael Lake (born March 14, 1957) is an American former professional baseball backup catcher, who played in Major League Baseball (MLB) from  to  for the Chicago Cubs, St. Louis Cardinals, and Philadelphia Phillies, Lake batted and threw right-handed.

Lake started Game 7 of the 1987 World Series for the Cardinals and went 1-for-3 with an RBI single. Over his career, he threw out 45.43% of the base runners who tried to steal a base on him, ranking him 9th on the all-time list. 

He may be best remembered for a 1991 Studio baseball card which featured his pet bird, Ruffles.

His children include Ryan Lake, Brendan Lake, and Jordan Parkes.

References

External links

Steve Lake at SABR (Baseball BioProject)
Steve Lake at Baseball Almanac
Steve Lake at Baseball Library

1957 births
Living people
Baseball players from Inglewood, California
Major League Baseball catchers
Chicago Cubs players
St. Louis Cardinals players
Philadelphia Phillies players